or Hidetoshi was born the sixth son of Oda Nobuhide, a feudal warlord in Owari Province, Japan, during the Sengoku period. He was the half-brother of Oda Nobunaga and the full brother of Oda Nobuhiro, with all three having the same father. He later became the adopted son of Oda Nobuyasu, his uncle.

Take control of Moriyama Castle
On May 10, 1555, Nobunaga took control of Kiyosu Castle and began using it as his residence. He then gave Nagoya Castle, his former residence, to his uncle Oda Nobumitsu, ruler of Moriyama Castle, who had provided him with support. In turn, Nobumitsu gave control of Moriyama Castle to Oda Nobutsugu.

The following month, on June 26, Nobutsugu killed Nobunaga's sixth younger brother, Oda Hidetaka, who was riding his horse along the Shōnai River near Moriyama Castle. Both Nobunaga and his feuding brother, Oda Nobuyuki, tried to take control of the castle, but Sakuma Nobumori intervened to keep the peace. Nobutoki was allowed to move his forces in and take control of the castle.

During the rebellion of Nobunaga's retainers who intended to replace him with his younger brother Oda Nobuyuki (July-September 1556), which culminated in the battle of Ino, Nobutoki was captured by rebels in Moriyama Castle and forced to commit seppuku in July 1556, or the sixth month of the year Kōji-2.

Family
Father: Oda Nobuhide (1510–1551)
Adopted Father: Oda Nobuyasu
Brothers
Oda Nobuhiro (died 1574)
Oda Nobunaga (1534–1582)
Oda Nobuyuki (1536–1557)
Oda Nobukane (1548–1614)
Oda Nagamasu (1548–1622)
Oda Nobuharu (1549–1570)
Oda Nobuoki  
Oda Hidetaka (died 1555)
Oda Hidenari
Oda Nobuteru
Oda Nagatoshi
Sisters:
Oichi (1547–1583)
Oinu

References

1556 deaths
Samurai
Oda clan
Year of birth unknown